Pontus Carle (born in 1955 in Sweden) is a contemporary artist living between Paris and Berlin.

Biography 
Pontus Carle was raised in Paris, where he moved with his family at the age of four.

He studied etching at the Academie Henri Goetz in Paris in 1973. He continued his education at the Beaux Arts in Paris in 1976, concentrating on lithography and painting. This is followed by a year studying etching and lithography in Malmö, Sweden. Carle lived in New York City between 1980 and 1989, where he started exhibiting his work in 1985.

Since 1991, he has lived and worked in Paris and Berlin. His work is exhibited in Europe and the United States, and is represented in numerous museums and private collections in Europe and in the United States.

Exhibitions 
 American Scandinavian Foundation, New York, 1983
 Opus Art Studios, Miami, 1985
 Now Gallery, New York, 1986
 Barbara Braathen and Leo Castelli, New York, (group), 1987
 Galleri Futura, Stockholm, 1988
 Galerie Marc Espinosa, Paris, 1991
 Ljungby Konsthall, Ljungby, Sweden, 1992
 Galerie Vitoux-Zylberman, Paris, 1993
 Galerie Auf Zeit, Berlin, 1993
 Kunstverein Herzattacke, Berlin, 1994
 Musee de Montelimar, Montelimar, France, 1994
 Galerie Area, Paris, France, (group), 1995
 Kunstverein Wismar, Wismar, Germany, 1997
 Galerie Auf Zeit, Berlin, 1997
 Galerie Mabel Semmler, Paris, 1998
 Haus Am Lützowplatz, Berlin, 1998
 Konsthallen i Hishult, Hishult, Sweden, 1999
 Die Alster Villa, Hamburg, 1999
 Galerie Mabel Semmler, Paris, 2000
 Galleri Svenska Bilder, Stockholm, 2001
 Galleri Astley, Uttersberg, Sweden, 2001
 Nordiska Ministerrådet, Copenhagen, Denmark, 2002
 Stadtmuseum Jena, Jena, Germany, 2002
 Stadtmuseum Speyer, Speyer, Germany, 2003
 Galleri Remi, Östersund, Sweden, 2003
 Galleri Sander, Norrköping, Sweden, 2004
 Galleri Futura, Stockholm, 2005
 Konsthallen I Pumphuset, Landskrona, Sweden, 2006
 Galleri Astley, Uttersberg, Sweden, 2006
 Ronneby Konsthall, Ronneby, Sweden, 2007
 Sörmlands Museum och Konsthall, Nyköping, Sweden, 2007
 Match Artspace, New York, 200
 Galleri Lindqvist, Arkelstorp, Sweden, 2009
 Galleri Sander, Norrköping, Sweden, 2009
 Grafiska Sällskapet, Stockholm, Sweden, 2010
 Galerie Charlot, Paris, France, 2010
 Grafik i Väst, Gothenburg, Sweden, 2011
 Galerie Charlot, Paris, France, 2012
 Karlskrona Konsthall, Karlskrona, Sweden, 2012
 Karlsruhe Artfair, Karlsruhe, Germany, 2012
 Galleri Jan Wallmark, Stockholm, Sweden, 2012
GALERIE BORN, Berlin, Germany, 2018

Collections (selection) 
 Landesbibliothek, Berlin, Germany
 Sammlungen der Berlinischen Galerie, Berlin, Germany
 Sammlung der Robert Havemann Gesellschaft Gedenkebibliothek, Berlin, Germany
 Staatlische Museen, Stiftung
 Preussischer Kulturbesitz, Kupferstitchkabinett SMPKKunstbibliothek, Berlin, Germany
 Public Library, Boston, MA, USA
 Museum Schloss Burgk, Burgk, Saale, Germany
 Harvard University, Cambridge, MA, USA
 Musee Bertrand, Chateauroux, France
 Brandenburgische Kunstsammlung, Cottbus, Germany
 Meermano- Westreenanum Rijkmuseum, Den Haag, Netherlands
 Säschsische Landesbibliothek, Staats und Universitätsbibliothek, Dresden, Germany
 Staatlische Kunstsammlung, Kupferstichkabinett, Dresden, Germany
 Deutsche Bibliothek, Frankfurt am Main, Germany
 Stadt und Universitätsbibliothek, Frankfurt am Main, Germany
 Staatsbibliothek “Carl von Ossietzky”, Hamburg, Germany
 Kunst und Museumsbibliothek, Köln, Germany
 Deutsche Bücherei, Buch und Schriftmuseum, Leipzig Germany
 Ljungby Konsthall, Ljungby, Sweden
 Schiller Nationalmuseum, Deutsches Litteraturarchiv, Marbach, Germany
 Lunds Universitetsbibliotek, Lund, Sweden
 Bayerische Staatsbibliothek, München, Germany
 Lyrik Kabinett, München, Germany
 Public Library, Newark, NJ, USA
 American Scandinavian Foundation, New York, NY, USA
 Chase Manhattan Bank, New York, NY, USA
 Columbia University, Special Collection, New York, NY, USA
 Public Library, Spencer Collection, New York, NY, USA
 Germanisches Nationalmuseum, Nürnberg, Germany
 Nürnberg Institut für Moderne Kunst, Nürnberg, Germany
 Musée de Klingspor, Offenbach, Germany
 BNF, Bibliothèque Nationale, Paris, France
 Bayern Stadtsparkasse, Pfaffenhofen, Germany
 Landesbibliothek Mecklenburg Vorpommern, Schwerin, Germany
 Brown University, John Hay Library, Providence, Rhode Island, USA
 Stanford University, Stanford, CA, USA
 Würtembergische Landesbibliothek, Stuttgart, Germany
 Kungliga Biblioteket, Stockholm, Sweden
 Hochschule für angewandte Kunst, Wismar, Germany
 Kulturamt, Wismar, Germany
 Herzog August Bibliothek, Wolfenbüttel, Germany
 Museum für Gestaltung, Zurich, Switzerland
 Lilly University, Indiana, USA

Publications 
  2012 - Pontus Carle. On my mind. Editions Galerie Charlot

External links 
 Official website: www.pontuscarle.com
 Galerie Charlot : Pontus Carle

Notes and references 

Swedish contemporary artists
Living people
1955 births
Alumni of the Académie Goetz